Wayne W. Wood (born January 21, 1930) is a retired American autoworker, contractor, and Democratic politician.  He served nearly 30 years in the Wisconsin State Assembly (1976–2005), representing Janesville, Wisconsin.

Biography
Wood was born on January 21, 1930, in Janesville, Wisconsin. He graduated from high school in Stoughton, Wisconsin. Wood is married with six children.

Career
Wood was first elected to the Assembly in a special election in 1976. He was also a member of the Janesville Housing Authority from 1971 to 1977 and the Janesville City Council from 1972 to 1976, serving as President from 1974 to 1975. Wood is a Democrat. He ran for the United States House of Representatives in 1993 as a pro=life Democrat to fill the vacancy left by Les Aspin when he became Bill Clinton's Sec. of Defense, but failed to get the Democratic nomination.

References

Politicians from Janesville, Wisconsin
People from Stoughton, Wisconsin
Democratic Party members of the Wisconsin State Assembly
Wisconsin city council members
1930 births
Living people
21st-century American politicians